Before the Rain is the third album by the British R&B vocal group Eternal, released on 17 March 1997. The album includes the single "I Wanna Be the Only One" (a duet with BeBe Winans) which became Eternal's first and only number one hit in the United Kingdom. The album features lead vocals from Vernie Bennett ("Think About Me") and Kéllé Bryan ("I'm Still Crying", "All My Love"), and is their last to feature Bryan.

A commercial success, the album went Gold in its first week, debuting with sales of 100,000 copies before being certified Platinum. In June 2019, Before the Rain was ranked at number 35 on the Official Charts Company's list of the "top 40 biggest girl band studio albums of the last 25 years". According to Billboard, a US release was planned for 26 August 1997, featuring 4 additional tracks. "Dreams", produced by Peter Mokran and Emosia was slated as the lead single and was serviced to R&B radio on 9 June 1997.

Single releases
"Someday", which was the theme to Disney's The Hunchback of Notre Dame, was released as a single in 1996, the year before Before the Rain was released. "Don't You Love Me" was released just before the album's release, followed by the duet with American singer BeBe Winans "I Wanna Be the Only One", which reached number one in the UK, becoming Eternal's first and only number one hit there. "How Many Tears" was scheduled for release as a single but plans were dropped due to the future release of the Greatest Hits. Australian version of the album includes the original mix of Dreams. Dreams was intended to be a single in the US where a repackaged version of Before The Rain would've been released, re-titled "Dreams" and including a further two new songs. These are thought to have been "Angel of Mine" and "Talk About it".

Critical reception and sales
Before the Rain received a positive response from music critics and fans and it gained Eternal a MOBO Award. The album peaked at number 3 on the UK Albums Chart and was certified Platinum by the BPI for sales of over 300,000 copies.

Track listing

Japanese bonus tracks
1. "Finally" (On the Japanese edition this was placed as the first track)
14. "12 Months"
15. "I'll Take a Pass on Love"
16. "I Wanna Be the Only One" (This version features only Easther on lead vocals)

Charts

Weekly charts

Year-end charts

Certifications

References

1997 albums
Eternal (band) albums